Silencing the Past: Power and the Production of History is a 1995 history book by Haitian historian Michel-Rolph Trouillot. The twentieth-anniversary edition features a foreword by Hazel V. Carby on the impact of Trouillot's work on postcolonial studies. Trouillot was an Anthropology and Social Sciences professor at the University of Chicago.

Synopsis
Silencing the Past is a meditation on the characteristics of power and how it influences the creation and recording of histories. Spanning examples from The Alamo and Christopher Columbus to the position of the Haitian Revolution in the collective memory of Western society, Trouillot analyzes conventional historical narratives to understand why certain parts of history are remembered when others are not.

Reception
The book was well received upon its release, with Kenneth Maxwell calling it a "beautifully written, superior book." The American Historical Review said the book was "written with clarity, wit, and style throughout," and Eric R. Wolf called it "a beautifully written book" in which Trouillot "interrogates history, to ask how histories are, in fact, produced." Silencing the Past was used as one of the bases for Raoul Peck's HBO miniseries, Exterminate All the Brutes.  The miniseries was released in 2021 to critical acclaim.

References

Haitian books
1995 non-fiction books
History books about Haiti
Postcolonial literature
Beacon Press books